South Hobart Football Club is an Australian soccer club based in Hobart, Tasmania. Founded in 1910, the club currently competes in the NPL Tasmania. South Hobart plays home games at South Hobart Ground and also fields teams in all junior divisions, as well as women's teams.

South Hobart has a continuing reputation for identifying quality youth players and involving them in the first team. Former Newcastle Jets forward Andy Brennan is a feature of this youth academy.

History
South Hobart is the oldest soccer club in Tasmania, as well as one of the most successful. They have won the State Championship a record 18 times. Add to this 21 Southern titles, 11 KO Cups, 3 Statewide KO Cups and 6 Falkinder Cups plus various other trophies, and stands out as Tasmania's most successful club. They played their first match on 21 May 1910. South Hobart won the league for the first time in 1919, and won the next four in a row. Although successful throughout their existence, they have only recently begun to again win trophies at the highest level. The 60s saw the influx of ethnic based clubs, and South Hobart has taken until the 21st Century to return to their former glory.

Celebrating their centenary in 2010 the club enjoyed their most successful season ever achieving a clean sweep across Tasmanian soccer, finishing 1st in the Southern Premier League, winning the Championship play-off along with the Statewide Cup, Summer Cup and Steve Hudson Cup. They also retained all these titles in 2011.

With the creation of the National Premier Leagues as the official second tier of Australian soccer for 2013, South Hobart finished in first place in Tasmanian division and won the regional championship playoffs. Progressing the final series they defeated Campbelltown City SC of South Australia in the semi-final. Taking on one of Australia's most famous and successful former NSL sides Sydney United 58 FC they were defeated 2–0 in the inaugural Grand Final.

2013 saw Kostas Kanakaris score the fastest hat-trick in Australian soccer when he scored three goals in almost 3 minutes against Launcestion City in the highest scoring match of that time. In 2014 South Hobart became the first Tasmanian side to qualify for the FFA Cup. The club was drawn against Tuggeranong United in the round of 32, though lost the match 4–5 on penalties after 1–1 result after extra-time. They competed in the 2015 edition as they went down in penalties again, this time to Sydney United 58

Former players

  Renato De Vecchi 
   Jay DaSees

Ground
South Hobart play their home games at South Hobart Ground, D'Arcy Street, South Hobart.  The ground is a picturesque ground at the base of the slopes of Mount Wellington with sweeping views over the city and the River Derwent. The club's headquarters however and training ground are located nearby at Wellesley Park, Wellesley Street, South Hobart.

Records
As the most successful and oldest currently existing club in Tasmania the club holds a number of records. Some of these include the longest unbeaten run in Tasmanian soccer – 63 games without defeat, the most state championships won and also the record for fastest hat-trick in Australian history when Kostas Kanakaris scored three in two minutes and 51 seconds in part of an 11–0 thrashing of Launceston City on 12 May 2013.

Seasons - Men

Honours
State Champions:
Winners (19): 1919, 1920, 1921, 1922, 1923, 1929, 1937, 1946, 1947, 1948, 1959, 2002, 2008, 2010, 2011, 2012, 2013, 2014, 2017
'Runners-up (4): 1926, 2009, 2015, 2018
Milan Lakoseljac Memorial Trophy (Statewide Cup)
Winners (6): 2008, 2010, 2011, 2014, 2015, 2019
Runners-up (2): 2016, 2018
National Premier Leagues Tasmania (NPL Tas Premiers)
Winners (3): 2013, 2014, 2017
Runners-up (2): 2015, 2018
Victory Cup / NPL Tas League Cup (NPL Tas Finals)
Winners (4): 2013, 2014, 2016, 2017
National Premier Leagues
Runners-up: 2013
Southern Premierships
Winners (21): 1919, 1920, 1921, 1922, 1923, 1926, 1929, 1937, 1946, 1947, 1948, 1959, 1978, 1980, 1999, 2002, 2008, 2009, 2010, 2011, 2012
Runners-up (15): 1924, 1925, 1927, 1928, 1930, 1933, 1936, 1939, 1951, 1956, 1957, 1958, 1961, 2001, 2007
KO Cup
 Winners (11): 1927, 1928, 1930, 1931, 1932, 1938, 1946, 1949, 1950, 1951, 1955
 Runners-up (8): 1929, 1933, 1936, 1937, 1954, 1956, 1957, 1958
Summer Cup
Winners (6): 2001, 2004, 2010, 2011, 2016, 2022
Runners-up (7): 1971, 1997, 1998, 2003, 2008, 2020, 2021
NPL Summer Series
Winners (1): 2018
Vase Cup
Winners: (1): 2001
Falkinder Cup
Winners (6): 1919, 1921, 1924, 1928, 1946, 1948
Runners-up (10): 1922, 1923, 1925, 1926, 1931, 1935, 1936, 1937, 1947, 1959
Steve Hudson Cup
Winners (4): 2008, 2009, 2010, 2011
Association Cup
Runners-up (1): 1960
Ascot Gold Cup
 Runners-up (1): 1960
Lloyd Triestino Cup
Runners-up (1): 1975

References

External links
 

 
National Premier Leagues clubs
Soccer clubs in Tasmania
Association football clubs established in 1910
1910 establishments in Australia
Sport in Hobart